Jada is a feminine given name, a variant of Jade, which comes from the precious stone of the same name.

List of people with the given name Jada
 Jada (biblical), a male figure in the Book of Chronicles in the Old Testament
 Jada Cacchilli, participant in American reality television series Bad Girls Club
 Jada Facer, American actress best known for Melissa & Joey
 Jada Hart, American tennis player
 Jada Mathyssen-Whyman, Australian football (soccer) goalkeeper
 Jada Pinkett Smith, American actress and singer
 Jada Renales, Trinidad and Tobago badminton player
 Jada Rowland, American actress and illustrator

See also
 Ja'da bint al-Ash'at, wife of Hasan bin Ali, one of the Prophet Muhammad's grandsons
 Jaida Essence Hall, American drag queen

Feminine given names